Niko Pucić de Zagorien (also Nicola Pozza in Italian; February 5, 1820 – April 13, 1883) was a writer and politician from the old Ragusan noble family.

Biography
He was born in Dubrovnik in 1820. He was the brother of Medo Pucić, another well-known politician. 

Pucić gave up his studies and started living from in Dubrovnik from 1838 because of his father's illness. He ran the family's accounts, often undertaking long journeys. Like his brother Medo, he maintained relations with the representatives of the political and cultural life in the monarchy, particularly in Croatia. After 1860 Pucić became an active representative of the national movement in Dalmatia. The Dalmatian and Croatian state parliament delegates sent Pucić in 1861, as their representative, to Vienna, where he attempted to convince the Imperial Court of the need to unify the two kingdoms. 

From 1867 to 1869 Pucić was vice-president of the Dalmatian Parliament. Afterwards he withdrew from politics and took part only in the region's culture life. Pucić was the first editor of the newspaper Dubrovnik and was one of the founders in 1878 of the newspaper Slovinac.

See also
 Republic of Ragusa
 House of Pucić
 Serb-Catholic movement in Dubrovnik

References

External links 
 Slovinac - old croatian newspaper
 Pucić - member of the old Ragusan noble family

1820 births
1883 deaths
People from Dubrovnik
People from the Kingdom of Dalmatia
Croatian politicians
Croatian Roman Catholics
Book and manuscript collectors